Yeranis Lee González (born 24 March 1999) is a Cuban footballer who plays as a midfielder for the Cuba women's national team.

International career
Lee capped for Cuba at senior level during the 2018 CONCACAF Women's Championship (and its qualification).

Lee scored 6 goals in one game in 2022 W Qualifiers.

International goals

References

1999 births
Living people
Cuban women's footballers
Cuba women's international footballers
Women's association football midfielders
21st-century Cuban women